Jim Ellison (born January 1952) is an American politician serving as a member of the Michigan House of Representatives. He is a member of the Democratic Party.

Career 
Before joining the Michigan State House, Ellison was the mayor of Royal Oak, Michigan from 2003 until he vacated the office in 2016 to take his seat in the state legislature.

Michigan House of Representatives

Committee assignments 
 Families, Children, and Seniors
 Health Policy
 Tax Policy
 Local Government

Electoral history

References 

Living people
Mayors of places in Michigan
Democratic Party members of the Michigan House of Representatives
People from Royal Oak, Michigan
21st-century American politicians
1952 births